Marble is a metamorphic rock consisting of carbonate minerals that recrystallize under the influence of heat, pressure and aqueous solutions, most commonly calcite  (CaCO3) or dolomite (CO3)2 and has a crystalline texture of varying thickness. Marble is typically not foliated (layered), although there are exceptions. About 10-15% of the sedimentary rocks on Earth are composed of limestone.

In geology, the term marble refers to metamorphosed limestone, but its use in stonemasonry more broadly encompasses unmetamorphosed limestone. Marble is commonly used for sculpture and as a building material.

Etymology

This stem is also the ancestor of the English word "marmoreal," meaning "marble-like." While the English term "marble" resembles the French , most other European languages (with words like "marmoreal") more closely resemble the original Ancient Greek.

Geology

Marble is a rock resulting from metamorphism of sedimentary carbonate rocks, most commonly limestone or dolomite (rock). Metamorphism causes variable recrystallization of the original carbonate mineral grains. The resulting marble rock is typically composed of an interlocking mosaic of carbonate crystals. Primary sedimentary textures and structures of the original carbonate rock (protolith) have typically been modified or destroyed.

Pure white marble is the result of metamorphism of a very pure (silicate-poor) limestone or dolomite protolith. The characteristic swirls and veins of many colored marble varieties are usually due to various mineral impurities such as clay, silt, sand, iron oxides, or chert which were originally present as grains or layers in the limestone. Green coloration is often due to serpentine resulting from originally magnesium-rich limestone or dolomite with silica impurities. These various impurities have been mobilized and recrystallized by the intense pressure and heat of the metamorphism.

Chemistry

Degradation by acids 
Acids react with the calcium carbonate in marble, producing carbonic acid (which decomposes quickly to CO2 and H2O) and other soluble salts :
CaCO3(s) + 2H+(aq) → Ca2+(aq) + CO2(g) + H2O (l)

Outdoor marble statues, gravestones, or other marble structures are damaged by acid rain whether by carbonation, sulfation or the formation of "black-crust" (accumulation of calcium sulphate, nitrates and carbon particles). Vinegar and other acidic solutions should be avoided in the cleaning of marble products.

Crystallization 
Crystallization refers to a method of imparting a glossy more durable finish on to a marble floor (CaCO3). It involves polishing the surface with an acidic solution and a steel wool pad on a flooring machine. The chemical reaction below shows a typical process using magnesium fluorosilicate (MgSiF6) and hydrochloric acid (HCl) taking place.

CaCO3(s) +  MgSiF6(l) + 2HCl (l) → MgCl2(s) + CaSiF6(s) + CO2(g) + H2O(l)

The resulting calcium hexafluorosilicate (CaSiF6) is bonded to the surface of the marble. This is harder, more glossy and stain resistant compared to the original surface.

The other often used method of finishing marble is the use of polishing with oxalic acid (H2C2O4), an organic acid. The resulting reaction is as follows.

CaCO3(s) + H2C2O4(l) → CaC2O4(s) + CO2(g) + H2O(l)

In this case the calcium oxalate (CaC2O4) formed in the reaction is washed away with the slurry leaving a surface that has not been chemically changed.

Microbial degradation 
The haloalkaliphilic methylotrophic bacterium Methylophaga murata was isolated from deteriorating marble in the Kremlin. Bacterial and fungal degradation was detected in four samples of marble from Milan Cathedral; black Cladosporium attacked dried acrylic resin using melanin.

Types

Examples of notable marble varieties and locations:

Uses

Sculpture
White marble has been prized for its use in sculptures since classical times. This preference has to do with its softness, which made it easier to carve, relative isotropy and homogeneity, and a relative resistance to shattering. Also, the low index of refraction of calcite allows light to penetrate 12.7 to 38 millimeters into the stone before being scattered out, resulting in the characteristic waxy look which brings a lifelike luster to marble sculptures of any kind, which is why many sculptors preferred and still prefer marble for sculpting.

Construction
Construction marble is a stone which is composed of calcite, dolomite or serpentine that is capable of taking a polish. More generally in construction, specifically the dimension stone trade, the term marble is used for any crystalline calcitic rock (and some non-calcitic rocks) useful as building stone. For example, Tennessee marble is really a dense granular fossiliferous gray to pink to maroon Ordovician limestone, that geologists call the Holston Formation.

Ashgabat, the capital city of Turkmenistan, was recorded in the 2013 Guinness Book of Records as having the world's highest concentration of white marble buildings.

Feature 
Marble is a rock composed of calcium and magnesium carbonate, mostly white and pink. Common marble varieties are granular limestone or dolomite. The hardness of marble is very high, because the internal structure of the rock is very uniform after long-term natural aging, and the internal stress disappears, so the marble will not be deformed due to temperature, and has strong wear resistance. It is a very popular building material.

Production 

The extraction of marble is performed by quarrying. Blocks are favoured for most purposes, and can be created through various techniques, including drilling and blasting, water jet and wedge methods. Limestones are often commercially and historically referred to as marble, which differs from the geological definition.

Locations 
In 1998, marble production was dominated by 4 countries that accounted for almost half of world production of marble and decorative stone. Italy and China were the world leaders, each representing 16% of world production, while Spain and India produced 9% and 8%, respectively.

In 2018 Turkey was the world leader in marble export, with 42% share in global marble trade, followed by Italy with 18% and Greece with 10%. The largest importer of marble in 2018 was China with a 64% market share, followed by India with 11% and Italy with 5%.

United States 
According to the United States Geological Survey, U.S. domestic marble production in 2006 was 46,400 tons valued at about $18.1 million, compared to 72,300 tons valued at $18.9 million in 2005. Crushed marble production (for aggregate and industrial uses) in 2006 was 11.8 million tons valued at $116 million, of which 6.5 million tons was finely ground calcium carbonate and the rest was construction aggregate. For comparison, 2005 crushed marble production was 7.76 million tons valued at $58.7 million, of which 4.8 million tons was finely ground calcium carbonate and the rest was construction aggregate. U.S. dimension marble demand is about 1.3 million tons. The DSAN World Demand for (finished) Marble Index has shown a growth of 12% annually for the 2000–2006 period, compared to 10.5% annually for the 2000–2005 period. The largest dimension marble application is tile.

Palestine 
The stone and marble industry is one of the largest industries in Palestine, contributing 20-25% of its total industrial revenues, generating USD $400–$450 million in revenue annually. The industry employs 15,000–20,000 workers across the West Bank across 1200–1700 facilities, and amounts to 4.5% of the nation's GDP. The vast majority of the industry's exports are to Israel.

Marble in the geologic sense does not naturally outcrop in Palestine, and that the vast majority of commercially labeled marble produced in Palestine produced would be geologically considered limestone.

Occupational safety

Particulate air pollution exposure has been found to be elevated in the marble production industry. Exposure to the dust produced by cutting marble could impair lung function or cause lung disease in workers, such as silicosis. Skin and eye problems are also a potential hazard. Mitigations such as dust filters, or dust suppression are suggested, but more research needs to be carried out on the efficacy of safety measures. 

In the United States, the Occupational Safety and Health Administration (OSHA) has set the legal limit (permissible exposure limit) for marble exposure in the workplace as 15 mg/m3 total exposure and 5 mg/m3 respiratory exposure over an 8-hour workday. The National Institute for Occupational Safety and Health (NIOSH) has set a recommended exposure limit (REL) of 10 mg/m3 total exposure and 5 mg/m3 respiratory exposure over an 8-hour workday.

Dust, debris and temperature fluctuations from working marble can endanger the eye health of employees. For the staff involved in marble processing, it is necessary to provide eye protection equipment, and it is recommended to improve the education of all workers on occupational health risks and strengthen preventive measures.

Cultural associations

As the favorite medium for Greek and Roman sculptors and architects (see classical sculpture), marble has become a cultural symbol of tradition and refined taste. Its extremely varied and colorful patterns make it a favorite decorative material.

Places named after the stone include Marblehead, Massachusetts; Marblehead, Ohio; Marble Arch, London; the Sea of Marmara; India's Marble Rocks; and the towns of Marble, Minnesota; Marble, Colorado; Marble Falls, Texas, and Marble Hill, Manhattan, New York. The Elgin Marbles are marble sculptures from the Parthenon in Athens that are on display in the British Museum.

Impact on the environment 
Total world quarrying production in 2019 was approximately 316 million tonnes; however, quarrying waste accounted for 53% of this total production. In the process of marble mining and processing, there will be a large amount of non-degradable waste, which will cause serious damage to the environment and threaten the life of animals and plants.  For example, the poor management of mining activities has resulted in a large amount of waste rocks, and the waste is thrown by the river, polluting the surrounding water sources, causing groundwater pollution, and endangering human health. According to the research of water samples around the marble mine, it was found that the number of cations and anions in the water increased.

Sustainability 
Marble sludge waste can be used as a mineral filler in water-based paints. Using ground calcium carbonate as a filler in paint production can improve the brightness, hiding power and application performance of paint, and can also replace expensive pigments such as titanium dioxide.   Recycling of marble waste leads to a large amount of waste not being landfilled, reducing environmental pollution, thereby realizing the sustainability of marble. Converting waste to generate economic income and restore degraded soil can improve the environment.

Gallery

See also
 Marble sculpture
 Marmorino
 Paper marbling
 Pietra dura, inlaying with marble and other stones
 Ruin marble, marble that contains light and dark patterns, giving the impression of a ruined cityscape
 Scagliola, imitating marble with plasterwork
 Verd antique, sometimes (erroneously) called "serpentine marble", and often confused with Connemara marble
 Naxian marble

References

External links

 Dimension Stone Statistics and Information – United States Geological Survey minerals information for dimension stone
 USGS 2005 Minerals Yearbook: Stone, Crushed
 USGS 2005 Minerals Yearbook: Stone, Dimension
 USGS 2006 Minerals Yearbook: Stone, Crushed
 USGS 2006 Minerals Yearbook: Stone, Dimension
 Marble Institute of America

 
Sculpture materials
Metasedimentary rocks
Limestone
Stone (material)
Symbols of Alabama